Brestovitsa may refer to several villages in Bulgaria:

Brestovitsa, Rousse Province and
Brestovitsa, Plovdiv Province